12 Songs of Christmas may refer to:

 12 Songs of Christmas (Frank Sinatra, Bing Crosby, and Fred Waring album)
 12 Songs of Christmas (Etta James album)
 Twelve Songs of Christmas, an album by Jim Reeves